Zemongo Faunal Reserve is a protected reserve of the Central African Republic. Established in 1925, it was extended and redesignated in 1975, although still open to hunting in 1980. The reserve contains dense Isoberlinia savanna woodland and gallery forests and supports eastern chimpanzees and other primate species. The reserve formerly held a large elephant population and a diverse antelope community.

References

Protected areas of the Central African Republic
Protected areas established in 1925
Haut-Mbomou
Northern Congolian forest–savanna mosaic